The Palm Cottage (also known as Flagler Worker's House) is a historic home in Miami, Florida. It is the last known building in Miami directly associated with railroad magnate and developer Henry M. Flagler. It is also one of the city's few surviving examples of Folk Victorian architecture. Built around 1897, this house was one of at least 30 rental houses that Flagler constructed as homes for the workers building his Royal Palm Hotel. The building was moved to Fort Dallas Park in 1980, located at 60 Southeast 4th Street. On January 4, 1989, it was added to the U.S. National Register of Historic Places.

References

External links

 
 Dade County listings at National Register of Historic Places
 Florida's Office of Cultural and Historical Programs
 Dade County listings
 Palm Cottage

Houses on the National Register of Historic Places in Florida
National Register of Historic Places in Miami
Houses in Miami-Dade County, Florida
1897 establishments in Florida
Houses completed in 1897